Gelemiş, Kaş is a village in the District of Kaş, Antalya Province, Turkey.

References

Villages in Kaş District